The Mercedes-Benz E-Class (V213) was launched at the 2016 Beijing Auto Show and, in August 2017 went on sale in China.

The new model received a completely new body and interior, making it visually distinct from its predecessor Mercedes-Benz E-Class (W212). The V213 E-Class is also known as the E-Class L (the "L" stands for "Long") and is the longest E-Class yet, with an overall length of 5.067m. The V213 comes in three basic models: the E200L, E300, and the E320L, which can be chosen with either Exclusive line or AMG Line bodies. The E-Class is equipped with an M274 or M276 engine, each powerful enough to accelerate the E200L from 0-60 mph in 8.6s, the E300L in 6.9s, and the E320L 4MATIC in 5.7s. The E-class is equipped with the 9G-Tronic transmission that features better efficiency and smoother gear changes than previous models.

Controversy 
Since its launch, controversies in China have continued. Taking inspiration in its design from the Mercedes-Benz S-Class and due to its long body, the V213 has been seen as the "smaller" S-Class. Even though every V213 comes equipped factory standard with a 12.3 inch display, automatic brakes, onboard Wifi and wireless charging, some customers have been dissatisfied that other new signature features, such as multi-beam headlights, are optional extras.

Some of the features offered for the V213 E-Class in China are not available in other countries. The fact that some of the standard features of the V213 are not available for the W213 and has made the V213 more popular than the W213. The V213 model has a 10.000 RMB price difference when compared to the W213 model.

References

E-Class (V213)